Giuseppe Bigazzi (Terranuova Bracciolini, 20 January 1933 – Arezzo, 7 October 2019) was an Italian executive, journalist, television presenter and writer. He was a television presenter for the RAI show La prova del cuoco.

In February 2010, on a television cooking show, the Italian food writer Beppe Bigazzi mentioned that during the famine in World War II cat stew was a "succulent" and well-known dish in his home area of Valdarno, Tuscany. Later he claimed he had been joking, but added that cats used to be eaten in the area during famine periods, historically. He was widely criticised in the media for his comments and ultimately dropped from the television network.

Books
1998 – La Cucina semplice dei Sapori d'Italia
1999 – Cinquanta itinerari italiani
2002 – La Farmacia e la Dispensa del Buon Dio

References

1933 births
2019 deaths
Italian male writers
People from the Province of Arezzo